Ultimate Spider-Man is a 2005 action-adventure game based on the Marvel Comics character Spider-Man and the comic book of the same name. The game was published by Activision for the PlayStation 2, Xbox, Microsoft Windows, Game Boy Advance, GameCube, and Nintendo DS. The PlayStation 2 and Xbox versions were developed by Treyarch and are drastically different from the handheld versions, which were developed by Vicarious Visions. The Windows version is a port of the PlayStation 2 and Xbox versions, developed by Beenox. A Limited Edition of the game was released for the PlayStation 2, and includes additional content such as a "making of" documentary and an interview with Spider-Man co-creator Stan Lee.

Like Treyarch's previous Spider-Man title, Spider-Man 2, the game incorporates an open world design, allowing players to freely explore fictitious representations of Manhattan and Queens when not completing main missions to advance the narrative. One notable feature exclusive to this game is the ability to play as both Spider-Man and Venom, who control differently and have exclusive storylines, which cross over with each other. The game's storyline is set within the Ultimate Marvel universe, three months after the Venom story arc from the Ultimate Spider-Man comics, and centers on Spider-Man's investigation of the company Trask Industries and their connection to the creation of the Venom symbiote and his parents' death. Meanwhile, Venom must avoid constant capture attempts by Bolivar Trask, who wants to recreate the symbiote's capabilities.

Ultimate Spider-Man received generally positive reviews from critics across all platforms, and is retrospectively regarded as one of the best Spider-Man games ever made. A prequel, Spider-Man: Battle for New York, developed by Torus Games, was released in November 2006 for the Game Boy Advance and Nintendo DS. Treyarch's next Spider-Man game, Spider-Man 3, was released in May 2007.

Gameplay
Ultimate Spider-Man is a third-person action-adventure video game, set in an open world based on Manhattan and parts of Queens. Players take on the role of Spider-Man or Venom and complete missions—linear scenarios with set objectives—to progress through the story. The player starts in story mode where they can only free roam as Spider-Man, and the game automatically switches between Spider-Man and Venom during missions. After the main story is completed, the player can switch between the two characters at any time.

The two characters play differently from one another. Spider-Man is more agile and uses webs to travel through the city, being able to either web swing or web zip. Similarly to Spider-Man 2, the player needs to be close to buildings and manually attach webs to them. Spider-Man can also use his webs during fights, immobilizing enemies for a few seconds, or grabbing and throwing them around. Once an enemy is down, the player needs to quickly web them in order to immobilize them for good, otherwise they will get up and continue attacking Spider-Man.

Venom is much more aggressive and uses his tentacles to pull himself to buildings, much like Spider-Man's web zip. He can also perform massive jumps and grab enemies, whom he can either throw away, crush against the ground, or consume. While playing as Venom, players can consume non-player characters to regenerate health; normal pedestrians usually grant the player more health points than enemies. While free roaming as Venom, he will slowly lose health regardless of taking damage or not, requiring the player to constantly consume people to regenerate health. Venom can throw cars and go on destructive rampages, earning police attention. The more destruction Venom causes, the more police will attempt to stop him.

As the game progresses, Spider-Man and Venom will have certain "City Goals" to accomplish in order to continue the storyline. These consist of various side missions, such as races, combat tours, and collectibles.

Handheld versions
The Game Boy Advance version of Ultimate Spider-Man is a side-scroller beat 'em up, divided into seven "issues", each containing three chapters. Both Spider-Man and Venom are playable, and each has his own series of levels. In addition to the two main characters, the game features three additional bosses: Shocker, Silver Sable, and Carnage. This version includes a limited supply of Spider-Man's web fluid, which can be refilled by picking up special markers scattered throughout levels or dropped by enemies. Additionally, players may choose to collect hidden power-ups to gain more web fluid capacity or gain moves and abilities for both Spider-Man and Venom.

The Nintendo DS version of Ultimate Spider-Man is a side-scroller beat 'em up, albeit it features a 3D environment. Both Spider-Man and Venom are playable, and each play differently from the other. In the Spider-Man levels, most of the game happens on the top screen and the touch screen is only used for selecting special attacks and operating certain objects (moving heavy objects, opening broken elevator doors, etc.). In the Venom levels, the game switches to the touch screen, and players are able to grab and throw objects or enemies using Venom's tentacles, or attack by tapping the screen. The game also features a slightly modified storyline and a multiplayer mode, where players can unlock different characters and arenas for a head-to-head fight.

Plot
The game opens with Peter Parker explaining how he became Spider-Man, and the creation of the Venom symbiote. While researching a cure for terminal illnesses, Peter and Eddie Brock's fathers, Richard Parker and Eddie Sr., created a black liquid substance that can envelop one's body and heal them, in addition to granting them superhuman abilities. However, the two were tricked into selling the project to Trask Industries, and subsequently died in a plane crash, without ever getting to complete work on the 'suit'. Years later, Peter and Eddie reunite and  discover the suit is their inheritance. After learning how his dad was cheated by Trask Industries, Peter tries to steal the suit and is covered by a portion of it. While it enhances his powers, the unstable suit also tries to consume him, forcing Peter to remove it. After discovering what Peter did and deducing his identity as Spider-Man, Eddie feels betrayed and takes the rest of the suit for himself, becoming Venom. 

Venom attacks Peter, only to seemingly die after being electrocuted by a downed power cable. Meanwhile, Trask Industries employee Adrian Toomes, who witnessed the confrontation, contacts Bolivar Trask to inform him of the suit's capabilities. Three months later, while Peter has returned to his normal life, Eddie has been forced to feed on the life energy of civilians to prevent the suit from consuming him. One night, he attacks and defeats Wolverine to prove his superior strength. The following day, Spider-Man stops R.H.I.N.O., a giant, rhinoceros-themed mecha suit rampaging through Queens, and leaves its pilot, Alex O'Hirn, for the police. Meanwhile, Trask hires Silver Sable and her Wild Pack to capture Eddie, but he transforms into Venom and escapes after ravaging their forces.

During a field trip to the Metropolitan Museum of Art, Peter senses Venom's presence nearby and defeats him. Eddie is captured by Sable, who Spider-Man assumes is working for S.H.I.E.L.D., and imprisoned inside an energy cage by Trask. Forced to test the Venom suit for him, he chases and defeats Electro. Spider-Man tries to intervene in their fight, but is knocked out by Electro. As S.H.I.E.L.D. agents led by Nick Fury arrive and arrest Electro, Eddie flees and returns to Trask. After Eddie reveals that he had more control over the suit in Spider-Man's presence, Trask remembers that Richard's DNA was used as the basis of the suit, and concludes that a DNA sample from Peter could be used to stabilize it. Deducing that Peter is Spider-Man, Trask sends Sable to track him down, but during their search, Eddie transforms into Venom and escapes.

Meanwhile, the Beetle, on the orders of his mysterious employer, releases the Green Goblin from S.H.I.E.L.D. custody and steals a vial containing a sample of the Sandman. After an encounter with Spider-Man, he escapes to the Latverian Embassy. Spider-Man later reluctantly agrees to infiltrate the Embassy after Fury asks him to, but ends up chasing the Goblin, who emerged from inside. Spider-Man subdues the Goblin, allowing S.H.I.E.L.D. to recapture him. Elsewhere, Venom defeats the Beetle when the latter attempts to collect a sample of the symbiote.

Sable later kidnaps Peter and attempts to deliver him to Trask, but he escapes and fights her. Venom arrives and kidnaps Sable, forcing Spider-Man to give chase. The confrontation leaves both Spider-Man and Venom exhausted, allowing Sable to deliver them to Trask. While Eddie is imprisoned, Peter is injected by Toomes with a makeshift sample of the symbiote, transforming him into Carnage. Venom escapes and defeats Carnage, before absorbing the symbiote off Peter, which gives him full control over the suit. He then attempts to exact revenge on Trask, but Spider-Man goes to warn him, leading Trask to attempt to escape via helicopter. When Venom tries to destroy the helicopter, Spider-Man stops and defeats him.

As S.H.I.E.L.D. arrives and arrests Venom and Trask, Peter retrieves some files from the latter, revealing that the plane crash that killed Peter's parents was caused by Eddie Sr. trying the Venom suit on board and losing control due to their incompatibility, just like Eddie. When Peter tells Fury that Eddie must see the files, Fury reveals that Eddie escaped. Days later, as Venom kills Trask in prison, Peter vocalizes his worries about Eddie to Mary Jane Watson, saying that he is not sure if he is scared of Eddie, or for him. Elsewhere, a partially transformed Eddie leaps from a skyscraper, turning into Venom just before he hits the ground.

Reception and legacy

Ultimate Spider-Man received "generally positive" and "mixed or average" reviews according to review aggregator Metacritic.

CiN Weekly gave it a score of 88 out of 100 and stated that "The true letdown... is that the master villains can still be supremely frustrating to defeat, requiring several replays and exhaustive bouts of highly patterned attacks". The New York Times gave it a positive-to-average review and said that the game was "very entertaining, and the addition of Nemesis creates some interesting new situations, but over all there isn't a lot of variety; you fight, you race, you ramble around the city, and then you do it all again". The Sydney Morning Herald gave it three-and-a-half stars out of five and stated that "combat against dim-witted goons can become repetitive but missions offer diversity".

Legacy

The premise of making a comic book styled Spider-Man game led to inspire other games such as 2010's Spider-Man: Shattered Dimensions.

Prequel

Spider-Man: Battle for New York, a side-scrolling beat 'em up where players can control both Spider-Man and the Green Goblin, was released for the Game Boy Advance and Nintendo DS on November 14, 2006. The game uses the same engine, and is also set in the Ultimate Marvel universe, serving as a prequel to the events of Ultimate Spider-Man.

Notes

References

External links

2005 video games
Activision beat 'em ups
Beenox games
Game Boy Advance games
GameCube games
Nintendo DS games
Open-world video games
PlayStation 2 games
Superhero video games
Treyarch games
Spider-Man (video game)
Video game franchises
Video games based on Spider-Man
Video games based on Venom (character)
Video games scored by Kevin Manthei
Video games developed in Canada
Video games developed in the United States
Video games set in New York City
Video games with alternative versions
Video games with cel-shaded animation
Windows games
Works by Brian Michael Bendis
Xbox games
Annie Award for Best Animated Video Game winners
Multiplayer and single-player video games
Vicarious Visions games